Wiebe van der Vliet-van Trotsenburg is a Netherlands-born film editor, sound editor, and post-production consultant.

Career 
After studying film editing at the Netherlands Film and Television Academy, van der Vliet became assistant editor for the Academy Award-winning 1995 film Antonia by Dutch director, writer, and feminist Marleen Gorris. After taking part of the Antonia team, van der Vliet started a film editing career.

In 1999, van der Vliet edited the original museum films for the Anne Frank Museum in Amsterdam.

In 2008, van der Vliet started working with the Danish documentary film director Tao Nørager. They collaborate under the name Roaddox. They primarily produce films about creative people or processes, and use the new media as their platform.

Other work 
Van der Vliet has been teaching film editing at Københavns Tekniske Skole, a technical school in Copenhagen.

Filmography

References

External links
 Roaddox's YouTube channel
 Wiebe van der Vliet YouTube channel
 Anne Frank Museum official YouTube channel
 Web Video Academy's Vimeo channel

1970 births
Living people
Mass media people from Amsterdam
Dutch film editors
People from Copenhagen